The New National Participation Party is a far-right political party in South Korea. Originally, the name was the Patriotic Party, but it was changed to the United Korean Party in February 2016 and later renamed to its current name on 20 December 2018.

External links

2015 establishments in South Korea
Anti-communism in South Korea
Anti-communist parties
Anti-Islam political parties
Conservative parties in South Korea
Far-right politics in South Korea
Korean nationalist parties
Political parties established in 2015
Anti-Islam sentiment in South Korea